Ali Kimera is a Ugandan professional footballer who plays as a goalkeeper for Busoga United.

International career
In January 2014, coach Milutin Sedrojevic, invited him to be included in the Uganda national football team for the 2014 African Nations Championship. The team placed third in the group stage of the competition after beating Burkina Faso, drawing with Zimbabwe and losing to Morocco.

References

Living people
Uganda A' international footballers
2014 African Nations Championship players
Ugandan footballers
1991 births
SC Victoria University players

Association football goalkeepers
Uganda international footballers
Busoga United FC players